Governor Phillips may refer to:

Arthur Phillip (1738–1814), 1st Governor of New South Wales
Frederick Albert Phillips (1918–2011), Governor of Saint Christopher-Nevis-Anguilla from 1967 to 1969.
John Calhoun Phillips (1870–1943), 3rd Governor of Arizona
Leon C. Phillips (1890–1958), 11th Governor of Oklahoma
Nigel Phillips (born 1963), Governor of the Falkland Islands since 2017
William Edward Phillips (born 1769), Acting Governor of the Prince of Wales Island on three occasions from 1810 to 1811

See also
Emanuel L. Philipp (1861–1925), 23rd Governor of Wisconsin
Richard Philipps (1661–1750), Governor of Nova Scotia from 1717 to 1749